The Emancipation Stakes is an Australian Turf Club Group 2 Thoroughbred horse race, for fillies and mares aged three years old and older, over a distance of 1500 metres at Rosehill Gardens Racecourse. Total prize money for the race is A$200,000.

History
The race is named in honour of the former champion mare Emancipation.

The inaugural running of the race was as the third race on Easter Monday AJC Autumn Carnival racecard in 1985 with Aspirations winning.

The record time for the race was set by Fantasia in 2006 in a time of 1:34.52.

Jockey Shane Dye has ridden the most winners with six.

Grade
1985–1994 – Listed race
1995–1998 – Group 3
1999 onwards – Group 2

Distance
 1985–2013 – 1600 metres
 2014 onwards – 1500 metres

Venue
 1985–2013 – Randwick Racecourse
 2014–2021 – Rosehill Gardens Racecourse
 2022 – Newcastle Racecourse
 2023 onwards – Rosehill Gardens Racecourse

Winners

 2022 - Promise Of Success 
 2021 - Nimalee 
2020 – Positive Peace 
2019 – Invincible Gem
2018 – Prompt Response
2017 – Zanbagh
2016 – Zanbagh
 2015 – Catkins
 2014 – Catkins
 2013 – Skyerush
 2012 – Skyerush
 2011 – Sworn to Secrecy
 2010 – Sacred Choice
 2009 – Amberino
 2008 – Kosi Bay
 2007 – Hot Danish
 2006 – Fantasia
 2005 – Perfect Promise
 2004 – Hec of a Party
 2003 – Faith Hill
 2002 – Miss Zoe
 2001 – Heather
 2000 – Beat The Fade
 1999 – Staging
 1998 – Palia
 1997 – Almazyoon
 1996 – Star County
 1995 – Vital Consent
 1994 – Ausmart 
 1993 – Hysterical 
 1992 – Romanee Conti
 1991 – Ice Cream Sundae
 1990 – Top Dance
 1989 – Twining
 1988 – Balmoral
 1987 – Clavell's Girl
 1986 – Sea Pictures
 1985 – Aspirations

See also
 List of Australian Group races
 Group races

External links
 First three placegetters Emancipation Stakes (ATC)

References

Horse races in Australia
Randwick Racecourse